Tabanus endymion is a species of horse fly in the family Tabanidae.

Distribution
United States.

References

Tabanidae
Insects described in 1878
Taxa named by Carl Robert Osten-Sacken
Diptera of North America